John Durnford Jernegan (June 12, 1911 – November 6, 1980) was an American Career Foreign Service Officer who served as the Ambassador Extraordinary and Plenipotentiary to Iraq from 1958 until the Government of Iraq requested his departure on June 2, 1962. He left his post on June 11, 1962.  Jernegan was also Ambassador Extraordinary and Plenipotentiary to Algeria from 1965 until Algeria severed diplomatic relations with the United States on June 6, 1967.

Early life
Jernegan was born on June 12, 1911 in Long Beach, California. 

He was considered Persona non Grata after siding with Britain when Britain was going to protect Kuwait when Abdul Karim Qasim, the Iraqi leader, laid claim to Kuwait.  

Qasim “designated the Kuwaiti monarch “qa’im maqam” – a subordinate to the governor of Basra – and threatened to “liberate” the country by force if the Kuwaiti monarch refused to accept this new designation.” Britain had supported Qasim in the recent past but now pressured the White House to protect Kuwait.

Death
Jernegan died in Carmel Valley, California on November 6, 1980, at the age of 69.

References

External links
John D. Jernegan Oral History Interview JFK Library

1911 births
1980 deaths
Ambassadors of the United States to Iraq
United States Foreign Service personnel
Ambassadors of the United States to Algeria
20th-century American diplomats